Midwest Modesty is the fifth studio album from Before Their Eyes. InVogue Records released the album on December 18, 2015.

Background
The band got Craig Owens to produce the album and be their co-writer on every song.

Critical reception

Signaling in a three star review by New Noise Magazine, Nathaniel Lay states, "Midwest Modesty probably doesn’t beat out the Before Their Eyes debut for most fans (no surprise there), but it could very well become the runner-up in the band’s discography. It’s well written, tight, and (for the most part) organized in a successful flow." Kevin Hoskins, indicating in a four and a half star review at Jesus Freak Hideout, writes, "So what does Midwest Modesty have in store? Simply put, it's an album that all current BTE fans and hard rock lovers will deeply appreciate."

Track listing

Chart performance

References

2015 albums
Before Their Eyes albums
InVogue Records albums